Miantang-e Sofla (also Romanized as Mīāntang-e Soflá) is a village in Kakavand-e Sharqi Rural District, Kakavand District, Delfan County, Lorestan Province, Iran. At the 2006 census, its population was 102, in 21 families.

References 

Towns and villages in Delfan County